Clifford is a civil parish in the metropolitan borough of the City of Leeds, West Yorkshire, England.  The parish contains 15 listed buildings that are recorded in the National Heritage List for England.  Of these, one is listed at Grade II*, the middle of the three grades, and the others are at Grade II, the lowest grade. The parish contains the village of Clifford and the surrounding countryside.  The listed buildings consist of houses, two churches and associated structures, two public houses, a former school house and schoolroom, a farmhouse and a ha-ha, a well head, and a war memorial.


Key

Buildings

References

Citations

Sources

 

Lists of listed buildings in West Yorkshire